Virus is a Dark Horse Comics comic book, written by Chuck Pfarrer, drawn by Canadian artist Howard Cobb and first published in 1992. The story is about an alien life form which takes over a Chinese Navy  research vessel and reconfigures it—using both the damaged electronics and the dead bodies of the crew, it propagates itself by making various "creatures" created out of both organic and inorganic parts. When a salvage ship shows up they have to deal with the life form or be taken over as well.

Pfarrer said in an interview that when he wrote the original story as a script in the early 1990s, the special effects for a film adaptation wouldn't have been possible, so he sold the script to Dark Horse as a comic. It was adapted into the 1999 science fiction horror film Virus, directed by John Bruno.

Collected editions
Dark Horse Comics, June 1995, 

1992 comics debuts
American comics adapted into films
Dark Horse Comics titles
Science fiction comics
Dark Horse Comics adapted into films